In molecular geometry, bond length or bond distance is defined as the average distance between nuclei of two bonded atoms in a molecule. It is a transferable property of a bond between atoms of fixed types, relatively independent of the rest of the molecule.

Explanation 
Bond length is related to bond order: when more electrons participate in bond formation the bond is shorter. Bond length is also inversely related to bond strength and the bond dissociation energy: all other factors being equal, a stronger bond will be shorter. In a bond between two identical atoms, half the bond distance is equal to the covalent radius.

Bond lengths are measured in the solid phase by means of X-ray diffraction, or approximated in the gas phase by microwave spectroscopy. A bond between a given pair of atoms may vary between different molecules. For example, the carbon to hydrogen bonds in methane are different from those in methyl chloride. It is however possible to make generalizations when the general structure is the same.

Bond lengths of carbon with other elements 
A table with experimental single bonds for carbon to other elements is given below. Bond lengths are given in picometers. By approximation the bond distance between two different atoms is the sum of the individual covalent radii (these are given in the chemical element articles for each element). As a general trend, bond distances decrease across the row in the periodic table and increase down a group. This trend is identical to that of the atomic radius.

Bond lengths in organic compounds
The bond length between two atoms in a molecule depends not only on the atoms but also on such factors as the orbital hybridization and the electronic and steric nature of the substituents. The carbon–carbon (C–C) bond length in diamond is 154 pm. It is generally considered the average length for a carbon–carbon single bond, but is also the largest bond length that exists for ordinary carbon covalent bonds. Since one atomic unit of length(i.e., a Bohr radius) is 52.9177 pm, the C–C bond length is 2.91 atomic units, or approximately three  Bohr radii long.

Unusually long bond lengths do exist. Current record holder for the longest C-C bond with a length of 186.2 pm is 1,8-Bis(5-hydroxydibenzo[a,d]cycloheptatrien-5-yl)naphthalene, one of many molecules within a category of hexaaryl ethanes, which are derivatives based on hexaphenylethane skeleton. Bond is located between carbons C1 and C2 as depicted in a picture below.

Another notable compound with an extraordinary C-C bond length is tricyclobutabenzene, in which a bond length of 160 pm is reported. Longest C-C bond within the cyclobutabenzene category is 174 pm based on X-ray crystallography. In this type of compound the cyclobutane ring would force 90° angles on the carbon atoms connected to the benzene ring where they ordinarily have angles of 120°.

The existence of a very long C–C bond length of up to 290 pm is claimed in a dimer of two tetracyanoethylene dianions, although this concerns a 2-electron-4-center bond. This type of bonding has also been observed in neutral phenalenyl dimers. The bond lengths of these so-called "pancake bonds" are up to 305 pm.

Shorter than average C–C bond distances are also possible: alkenes and alkynes have bond lengths of respectively 133 and 120 pm due to increased s-character of the sigma bond. In benzene all bonds have the same length: 139 pm. Carbon–carbon single bonds increased s-character is also notable in the central bond of diacetylene (137 pm) and that of a certain tetrahedrane dimer (144 pm).

In propionitrile the cyano group withdraws electrons, also resulting in a reduced bond length (144 pm). Squeezing a C–C bond is also possible by application of strain. An unusual organic compound exists called In-methylcyclophane with a very short bond distance of 147 pm for the methyl group being squeezed between a triptycene and a phenyl group. In an in silico experiment a bond distance of 136 pm was estimated for neopentane locked up in fullerene. The smallest theoretical C–C single bond obtained in this study is 131 pm for a hypothetical tetrahedrane derivative.

The same study also estimated that stretching or squeezing the C–C bond in an ethane molecule by 5 pm required 2.8 or 3.5 kJ/mol, respectively. Stretching or squeezing the same bond by 15 pm required an estimated 21.9 or 37.7 kJ/mol.

References

External links 
 Bond length tutorial

Length
Molecular geometry
Length